Ásgeir Eyjólfsson (4 May 1929 – 21 April 2021) was an Icelandic alpine skier. He was born in Reykjavík and first started skiing at the age of 13. He became one of the best known skiers in Iceland and competed in three events at the 1952 Winter Olympics

References

External links
 

1929 births
2021 deaths
Ásgeir Eyjólfsson
Ásgeir Eyjólfsson
Alpine skiers at the 1952 Winter Olympics
Ásgeir Eyjólfsson
20th-century Icelandic people